Lieutenant Howard Burdick (12 December 1891—20 January 1975) DSC DFC was an American World War I flying ace credited with eight confirmed aerial victories. He and his son, Clinton D. Burdick, are the only known pair of father-son flying aces.

Biography

Born in Brooklyn, New York, Howard Burdick joined the Air Service, United States Army in 1917 and was deployed to France. He was assigned to the 17th Aero Squadron, and flew British Sopwith Camels while attached to the Royal Air Force. For his actions in combat, he was awarded the Distinguished Flying Cross for eight aerial victories, often flying in company with George Vaughn, his flight commander.  

Burdick forced down an enemy Fokker biplane with Vaughn on 14 October 1918. Burdick was excited with worry about the fate of his friend Howard Knotts, who had fallen behind enemy lines, and took his revenge on the downed German, shooting him to death on the ground. 

Eventually settling in California, Burdick died in Los Angeles in January 1975.

Aerial victory list

Howard Burdick achieved all his victories while flying a Sopwith Camel for the 17th Aero Squadron.

Honors and awards

Distinguished Service Cross
The Distinguished Service Cross is presented to Howard Burdick, Second Lieutenant (Air Service), U.S. Army, for extraordinary heroism in action northwest of Cambrai, France, September 28, 1918. Attacked by two Fokker biplanes, Lieutenant Burdick outmaneuvered both machines, shot one into flames and routed the other one. Later, seeing three Fokkers attacking an American aviator, he at once dove into the combat to his assistance, shooting down one and driving off the other two. His quick and unhesitating attack, single-handed, on the three Fokkers save the life of his fellow pilot. General Orders No. 38, W.D., 1921

Distinguished Flying Cross
For skill and gallantry. On 25 October, while on an offensive patrol, this officer attacked a formation of five Fokker biplanes over the forest of Mormal and succeeded in shooting down one in flames. On another occasion he dived on an enemy two-seater but was in turn attacked by two Fokkers, one of which he succeeded in shooting down in flames. Later he attacked three enemy aircraft who were attacking one of our machines and shot down one which dived straight into the ground and crashed. This officer has now destroyed five EA (three in flames) and has at all times displayed the greatest gallantry, skill and disregard of danger.

See also

 List of World War I flying aces from the United States

References

Bibliography
 Over the Front: A Complete Record of the Fighter Aces and Units of the United States and French Air Services, 1914-1918 (1992). Norman L. R. Franks, Frank W. Bailey. Grub Street. , .
 American Aces of World War I. Norman Franks, Harry Dempsey. Osprey Publishing, 2001. , .

External links
Harold Burdick at the aerodrome forum

American World War I flying aces
Aviators from New York (state)
1891 births
1975 deaths
Recipients of the Distinguished Service Cross (United States)
Recipients of the Distinguished Flying Cross (United Kingdom)
Military personnel from New York (state)
Burials at Forest Lawn Memorial Park (Hollywood Hills)